Eucalyptus sparsifolia, commonly known as the narrow-leaved stringybark, is a tree endemic to New South Wales. It has grey to reddish brown, stringy bark, glossy green lance-shaped leaves, spindle-shaped flower buds and more or less spherical fruit.

Description
The operculum is cone-shaped with a beaked tip, shorter than or about as long and wide as the flower cup. The stamens are white. Flowering mainly occurs from September to December.

Taxonomy and naming
Eucalyptus sparsifolia was first formally described in 1934 by William Blakely who published the description in A Key to the Eucalypts. The specific epithet (sparsifolia) is derived from Latin ("sparse-leaved"), referring to the crown but is probably a misnomer.

This species was formerly included with E. oblonga which included trees with a wide range of leaf widths. Those with broader leaves are now included in E. globoidea.

Distribution and habitat
The narrow-leaved stringybark is widespread and abundant in forest and woodland in the Sydney region and as far inland as the Pilliga forest.

References

sparsifolia
Myrtales of Australia
Flora of New South Wales
Plants described in 1934
Taxa named by William Blakely